MUNFLA (Memorial University of Newfoundland Folklore and Language Archive) is the largest sound recording folklore archive in Canada. It is hosted at Memorial University of Newfoundland, located in the G.A. Hickman Building at the St. John's campus in Newfoundland, Canada. It is a member of the Canadian Council of Archives and the Association of Newfoundland and Labrador Archives. MUNFLA was founded in 1968 by folklorist Herbert Halpert, head of the Folklore Department, and his wife, researcher-librarian Violetta Maloney Halpert, as a joint-venture by the Folklore and English departments at Memorial University. The archive was created as a repository for recordings and material culture of Newfoundland and Labrador folk culture.

Collection 

The archive contains a variety of items including oral histories, songs, poetry, childlore, folk narratives, personal experience narratives, folk beliefs as well as student research papers and graduate theses and dissertations from the Department of Folklore.

References

External links

MUNFLA operates an online catalogue.

The archive also contains  The MacEdward Leach Collection of Songs of Atlantic Canada.

External links 
 MUNFLA
 Department of Folklore, Memorial University of Newfoundland 
 Memorial University of Newfoundland

Memorial University of Newfoundland
Folklore
Folklorists
Canadian folklore
Archives in Canada